John Dawnay, 4th Viscount Downe (9 April 1728 – 21 December 1780), was a British peer and Whig politician.

Background
Dawnay was the younger son of the Honourable John Dawnay, eldest son of Henry Dawnay, 2nd Viscount Downe. His mother was Charlotte Louisa, daughter of Robert Pleydell, while Henry Dawnay, 3rd Viscount Downe, was his elder brother.

Political career
Dawnay was returned to Parliament for Cirencester in 1754. In 1760 he succeeded in the viscountcy after the death of his elder brother in the Seven Years' War. However, as this was an Irish peerage it did not entitle him to a seat in the English House of Lords and consequently did not prevent him from remaining a member of the House of Commons. In 1768 he was returned for Malton, a seat he held until 1774.

Family

Lord Downe married Lora, daughter of William Burton, in 1763. They lived at Cowick Hall in Yorkshire and had at least seven children:

 John Dawnay, 5th Viscount Downe (1764–1832)
 William Henry Pleydell Dawnay, died young
 Hon. Catherine Dawnay (23 August 1768 – 9 July 1821)
 William Dawnay, 6th Viscount Downe  (1772–1846)
 Hon. Lora Dawnay (b. 17 June 1774), died young
 Hon. Marmaduke Dawnay (26 July 1777 – 1 October 1851), later (1824) Marmaduke Langley
 Hon. Rev. Thomas Dawnay (30 May 1779 – 1 January 1850), rector of Ashwell

Lord Downe died in December 1780, aged 62, and was succeeded by his eldest son, John. The Viscountess Downe died in April 1812.

References

1728 births
1780 deaths
Viscounts in the Peerage of Ireland
Members of the Parliament of Great Britain for English constituencies
British MPs 1754–1761
British MPs 1761–1768
British MPs 1768–1774
John